Alden v. Maine, 527 U.S. 706 (1999), was a decision by the Supreme Court of the United States about whether the United States Congress may use its Article I powers to abrogate a state's sovereign immunity from suits in its own courts, thereby allowing citizens to sue a state in state court without the state's consent.

Background 
In 1992, probation officers employed by the State of Maine filed a suit against their employer in United States District Court for the District of Maine. The probation officers alleged violations of the overtime provisions laid out in the Fair Labor Standards Act (FLSA), a federal statute, and requested liquidated damages and compensation. The federal court dismissed the suit by stating that the Eleventh Amendment gives the states sovereign immunity from suit in federal court. After the dismissal, the probation officers filed the same action in Maine state court. The state court also dismissed the case based on sovereign immunity. The case was then appealed to the Maine appellate courts and then to the Supreme Court of the United States.

Decision 
In a 5–4 ruling, the Court concluded that Article I of the Constitution does not provide Congress with the ability to subject nonconsenting states to private suits for damages in its own courts. In addition, the Court held that since Maine was not a consenting party in the suit, the ruling of the Supreme Court of Maine was upheld.

Writing for the Court, Justice Anthony Kennedy stated that the Constitution provides immunity for nonconsenting states from suits filed by citizens of that state or citizens of any other state and noted that such immunity is often referred to as "Eleventh Amendment Immunity." Such immunity, the Court continued, is necessary to maintain state sovereignty, which lies at the heart of federalism. However, "sovereign immunity derives not from the Eleventh Amendment but from the federal structure of the original Constitution itself."

After discussing the Eleventh Amendment, the Court turned to the question of whether Congress has the authority, under Article I of the Constitution, to subject nonconsenting states to private suits in their own courts. The majority ruled that Congress has no such authority, under the original Constitution, to abrogate states' sovereign immunity:

However, Congress may abrogate sovereign immunity when the suit is to enforce a statute protecting Fourteenth Amendment rights: 

The majority stated that the Supremacy Clause of the Constitution applies only to pieces of legislation that fit within its design. Therefore, any law passed by Congress pursuant to Article I that seeks to subject states to suit would violate the original Constitution. However, Congress may abrogate state sovereign immunity to pass legislation that enforces the Fourteenth Amendment, as in Fitzpatrick v. Bitzer (1976).

Dissent 
Justice David Souter's dissent argued that the concept of sovereign immunity had been misapplied by the majority. Souter continued by noting that the idea of sovereign immunity was unclear during the period of the Constitution's ratification. In addition, he argued, the Founding Framers would certainly have not expected the idea to remain static over numerous years. In addition, Souter argued that the FLSA was national in scope and so did not violate the principle of federalism, as was argued by the majority.

Souter also argued that the claim the FLSA was unconstitutional was spurious. Such thinking, he argued, could be reached only based upon the misguided notion of sovereign immunity and notion of federalism that the majority had used in reaching its decision:

Analysis 
Alden represents an extension of the Court's 1996 ruling in Seminole Tribe v. Florida, which held that Congress cannot use its powers under Article I of the Constitution to subject unconsenting states to suit in federal court. Alden held also that Congress cannot use its Article I powers to subject unconsenting states to suit in state court. Later, in Central Virginia Community College v. Katz (2006), the Court would narrow the scope of its previous sovereign immunity rulings and hold that Congress could use the Bankruptcy Clause of Article I to abrogate state sovereign immunity.

Sources

References

External links
 

United States Supreme Court cases
United States Supreme Court cases of the Rehnquist Court
United States Eleventh Amendment case law
Legal history of Maine
1999 in United States case law
1999 in Maine